is a retired Japanese athlete who specialised in sprinting events. He represented his country at the 1992 Summer Olympics as well as one indoor and two outdoor World Championships.

Competition record

Personal bests
Outdoor
100 metres – 10.30 (+1.0 m/s, Sapporo 1992)

Indoor
60 metres – 6.77 (Dortmund 1997)

References

All-Athletics profile

1970 births
Living people
Sportspeople from Aichi Prefecture
Japanese male sprinters
Olympic male sprinters
Olympic athletes of Japan
Athletes (track and field) at the 1992 Summer Olympics
Universiade medalists in athletics (track and field)
Universiade silver medalists for Japan
Medalists at the 1993 Summer Universiade
World Athletics Championships athletes for Japan
Japan Championships in Athletics winners
20th-century Japanese people